Electric Touch can refer to:
Electric Touch (band), a rock band from Texas
Electric Touch (album), a 2010 album by Russian singer Sergey Lazarev